Robert "Terminator" Piotrkowicz (born 17 January 1974 in Warsaw),  also nicknamed the "White Eagle", is an IFBB professional bodybuilder and powerlifter from Poland. He is only the second Mr. Olympia contestant to represent Poland in history. The first being Miroslaw Daszkiewicz. And the only one to have represented Poland twice (2010 and 2011). Since receiving his membership card in the IFBB in 2007, he is currently the only Polish bodybuilder recognized by the Federation. He is a Polish powerlifting champion and karate practitioner.

Biography

Trained as an engineer, he is a graduate of Warsaw University of Technology Faculty of Electrical Engineering. Currently he is the only Polish bodybuilder who possesses the most prestigious pro bodybuilding federation, the International Federation of Bodybuilders Pro card which he received on 15 July 2009. 2011 was his most active year in bodybuilding, as he entered 9 contests in that year.

He is married and has a daughter named Ola. He owns a fitness club, "Body Fan," located in Ząbki, which he runs together with his wife, Joanna. She writes articles for several industry magazines including Iron Man Spain, Bodybuilding and Fitness, Sport for All and Muscular Development. His first coach was another well-known Polish bodybuilder Peter Głuchowski. In 2013, he beat Toney Freeman and Ronny Rockel to become the Mr. Europe 2013.

Stats
 Height : 
 Contest Weight : 
 Off-season weight : 
 Chest : to 
 Upper Arm :  to   
 Forearm :  to  
 Waist :  to 
 Thigh :  to   
 Calf :  to

Powerlifting records
 Bench press: 250 kg 1RM 
 Barbell squat: 300 kg 1RM
 Deadlift: 320 kg 1RM

Pro career

 2009: IFBB Tampa Pro - 15 place
 2009: IFBB Europa Supershow - 5 place
 2009: IFBB Atlantic City Pro - 6 place
 2009: IFBB Sacramento Pro - 3 place (the first qualification for Mr. Olympia)
 2010: IFBB Arnold Classic Pro - 10 place
 2010: IFBB Mr. Europe Pro - 4 place
 2010: IFBB Mr. Olympia - 18 place
 2011: IFBB Arnold Classic Pro - 14 place
 2011: IFBB Mr. Europe Pro - 4 place
 2011: IFBB FIBO Power Pro Germany - 6 place
 2011: IFBB Europa Show of Champions - 7 place
 2011: IFBB Toronto Pro Supershow - 5 place
 2011: IFBB Tampa Bay Pro - 6 place
 2011: IFBB Phoenix Pro - 6 place
 2011: IFBB Tijuana Pro - 3 place (the second qualification for Mr. Olympia)
 2011: IFBB Mr. Olympia - 16 place
 2011: IFBB Arnold Classic Europe Pro - 7 place
 2012: IFBB Nordic Pro Championships - 2 place
 2012: IFBB Arnold Classic Europe - 4 place
 2013: IFBB Mr. Europe Pro - 1 place
 2013 IFBB Mr. Olympia - 16  
 2013 IFBB Prague Pro 8th 
 2014 IFBB Arnold Classic Brazil 11th 
 2014 IFBB Arnold Classic Europe 8th 
 2014 IFBB San Marino Pro 8th 
 2014 IFBB Nordic Pro 5th 
 2015 IFBB Nordic Pro - 5th place

References

External links
KiF Forum
Official website
FlexOnline profile

Polish bodybuilders
Polish powerlifters
Professional bodybuilders
Sportspeople from Warsaw
1974 births
Living people